Correll may refer to:
 Correll, Minnesota, city in Big Stone County, Minnesota, United States

Correll is the name of the following people:
 Bob Correll (born 1942), American stuntman
 Charles Correll (1890–1972), American radio comedian
 Charles Correll (director) (1944–2004), American television director and cinematographer
 Denny Correll (1946–2002), American rock singer
 Donovan Stewart Correll (1908–1983), American botanist
 Ernst Hugo Correll (1882–1942), German film producer
 Joshua Correll, American psychologist
 Nikolaus Correll (born 1977), German roboticist 
 Percy Correll (1892–1974), Australian Antarctic explorer
 Rich Correll (born 1948), American television actor, director, producer and writer
 Richard V. Correll (1904–1990), American painter and printmaker
 Vic Correll (born 1946), American baseball player

See also
Correll v. Herring, a 2016 court case
Corel, Canadian software company 
Corell (disambiguation)
Carrell (disambiguation)